Jiří Pecháček (born 5 August 1943) is a Czech equestrian. He competed in the individual jumping event at the 1992 Summer Olympics.

References

External links
 

1943 births
Living people
Czech male equestrians
Olympic equestrians of Czechoslovakia
Equestrians at the 1992 Summer Olympics
People from Plzeň-North District
Sportspeople from the Plzeň Region